Teldenia nivea is a moth in the family Drepanidae. It was described by Arthur Gardiner Butler in 1887. It is found on the Solomon Islands.

The length of the forewings is 12–13 mm.

References

Moths described in 1887
Drepaninae